Ostrężnik  is a small Polish settlement in Gmina Niegowa near Trzebniów in Silesian Voivodeship, northwestern corner of Lesser Poland.

Location
The settlement consists of only several houses, nevertheless, it is known for the ruins of the Ostrężnik Castle (right) built in early 14th century, as well as the nature reserve (left) called Rezerwat przyrody Ostrężnik established in 1960 with the total area of 4.1 ha.

The Ostrężnik Castle was one of over 25 medieval castles built by the order of King Casimir III the Great on large, tall rocks of the Polish Jura Chain in order to protect the capital city of Kraków as well as important trading routes against the invaders. The series of castles named the Eagles' Nests form the Trail of the Eagles' Nests of south-western Poland.

Ostrężnik is a popular destination for hiking trips, and mountain biking, with several marked trails.

Notes

References
 
 Jolanta Fidura, Zamki i inne warownie Wyżyny Krakowsko-Częstochowskiej, Częstochowa: Centralny Ośrodek Informacji Turystycznej, 1990
 Marceli Antoniewicz, Zamki na Wyżynie Krakowsko-Częstochowskiej: geneza – funkcje – konteksty, PAN. Oddział w Katowicach. Komisja Historyczna, Wydawnictwo Szumacher, Kielce 1998. 
 Zamek Ostrężnik (foto.esilesia.com)

Villages in Kłobuck County